Mount Harvard is the third highest summit of the Rocky Mountains of North America and the U.S. state of Colorado. The prominent  fourteener is the highest summit of the Collegiate Peaks and the fourth highest summit in the contiguous United States. The summit of Mount Harvard is the highest point in Chaffee County and is higher than any point in the United States east of its longitude. The mountain was named in honor of Harvard University.

History
Mount Harvard was named in 1869 by members of the first Harvard Mining School class, while on expedition with professor Josiah Dwight Whitney, the namesake of Mount Whitney.  The same group named the peak next to Harvard Mount Yale, after Whitney's alma mater.  The group climbed Yale first, and estimated that it was over 14,000 feet in height. On August 19, 1869, the first recorded ascent of Harvard was made by expedition members S. F. Sharpless and William M. Davis. Harvard and Yale were the first 14,000 foot mountains in the Sawatch range to be named after universities. Later, nearby mountains were named for Princeton, Columbia, and Oxford, leading to the name "Collegiate Peaks" for this part of the Sawatch Range.

The pole
In 1962, three Harvard men attempted to erect a fourteen-foot metal pole on the top of Harvard, with a sign that read "Mt. Harvard, 14,434.  This sign erected at an altitude of 14,434 making it the second highest point in the contiguous United States."  Before they could reach the top of the mountain darkness set in, and the group was forced to abandon the pole a few hundred yards short of the summit.  The next year, two Harvard men (Tim Wirth, who later represented Colorado's Second Congressional District and then served a term in the U.S. Senate, and his brother John), along with a Cornell graduate carried the pole the extra distance, and completed the task.  The pole sat on the mountain for roughly twenty years, until it disappeared at some time in the 1980s, most likely as part of an effort to clean up Colorado's fourteeners.

See also

List of mountain peaks of North America
List of mountain peaks of the United States
List of mountain peaks of Colorado
List of Colorado county high points
List of Colorado fourteeners

Notes

References

External links

Mount Harvard on 14ers.com
Mount Harvard on Distantpeak.com
Mount Harvard on Summitpost
Photo Journal of a Hike up Mount Harvard
Mount Harvard on Colorado Fourteener Initiative

Harvard
Harvard
Harvard
Harvard